Charles Holden Cowles (July 16, 1875 – October 2, 1957) was a North Carolina Republican politician who served one term in the United States House of Representatives.  He was the son of Calvin J. Cowles, a prominent Republican who was the son-in-law of William W. Holden. His uncle was Democratic Congressman William H. H. Cowles.

Biography
A native of Charlotte, North Carolina, Cowles moved to Wilkesboro at a young age. He worked as a deputy clerk for the federal court at Statesville and then as secretary for Congressman Edmond S. Blackburn before being elected to the North Carolina House of Representatives (1904–1908). Cowles entered the newspaper business in 1906 when he established the Wilkes Patriot (today the Wilkes Journal-Patriot). In 1908, Cowles was elected to the 61st United States Congress as a Republican. He was defeated for re-election in 1910 by Robert L. Doughton.

Later, Cowles was again elected to terms in the North Carolina House of Representatives (1920–1924, 1928–1930, and 1932–1934) and to one term in the North Carolina Senate (1938–1940). From 1941 through 1956, he returned to one of his first jobs: serving as a federal court clerk.

He died at a rest home in Wilkesboro on October 2, 1957.

References

External links
Congressional Biography

1875 births
1957 deaths
Republican Party members of the North Carolina House of Representatives
Republican Party North Carolina state senators
Republican Party members of the United States House of Representatives from North Carolina